The 2012 United States presidential election in Arkansas took place on November 6, 2012, as part of the 2012 General Election in which all 50 states plus the District of Columbia participated. Arkansas voters chose six electors to represent them in the Electoral College via a popular vote pitting incumbent Democratic President Barack Obama and his running mate, Vice President Joe Biden, against Republican challenger and former Massachusetts Governor Mitt Romney and his running mate, Congressman Paul Ryan.

Romney and Ryan carried Arkansas with 60.57% of the popular vote to Obama's and Biden's 36.88%, winning the state's six electoral votes. While Arkansas had been won by the Democrats as recently as 1996 by native son Bill Clinton, Obama proved a poor fit for the state, and his 23.69% margin of loss was the worst defeat for a Democratic presidential candidate in Arkansas since 1972's margin of 38.1%. Obama also was defeated by a larger margin in Arkansas than Walter Mondale in 1984.

As of 2020, this is the most recent election in which Woodruff County voted for the Democratic candidate. This is also the most recent election Arkansas voted to the left of Utah and the first election since 1984 where either nominee received 60% of the vote. Obama is the only Democrat to ever win two terms without carrying the state at least once.

Primaries

Democratic

The Democratic primary had 47 delegates at stake. All 47 delegates were allocated to, and pledged to vote for Barack Obama at the 2012 Democratic National Convention. While John Wolfe Jr. qualified for 19 delegates to the convention by virtue of his performances in Arkansas, State party officials  said Wolfe missed two paperwork filing deadlines related to the delegate process, therefore he was not eligible for any delegates.  Wolfe has commenced legal proceedings to have delegates in his name seated.  Eight other unpledged delegates, known as superdelegates, also attended the convention and cast their votes as well.

Republican

The Republican primary had 33 delegates at stake.  Mitt Romney won all 75 counties in Arkansas.  As a result, all 33 delegates were allocated to, and pledged to vote for Mitt Romney at the 2012 Republican National Convention.

Rick Santorum and Newt Gingrich withdrew from the [presidential race on April 10 and May 2, 2012, respectively. Both endorsed Mitt Romney as the nominee.

General election
Candidate Ballot Access:
 Mitt Romney/Paul Ryan, Republican
 Barack Obama/Joseph Biden, Democratic
 Gary Johnson/James P. Gray, Libertarian
 Jill Stein/Cheri Honkala, Green
 Peta Lindsay/Yari Osorio, Socialism and Liberation

Results

By county

By congressional district
Romney won all four of the state's congressional districts.

See also

 United States presidential elections in Arkansas
 2012 Democratic Party presidential primaries
 2012 Republican Party presidential debates and forums
 2012 Republican Party presidential primaries
 Results of the 2012 Republican Party presidential primaries

References

External links
The Green Papers: for Arkansas
The Green Papers: major state elections in chronological order

Arkansas
United States President
2012